Vladimir Silađi (born 23 April 1993) is a Serbian professional footballer who plays as a forward for Mladost Lučani in the Serbian Superliga.

Club career
After coming through the youth academy of Vojvodina, Silađi made his first-team debut for the club on 7 May 2011, coming on as a substitute for Giorgi Merebashvili in a 1–1 away draw with Borac Čačak.

In early 2016, Silađi moved to Serbian League Vojvodina side TSC Bačka Topola. He helped the club win promotion to the Serbian First League in 2017 and eventually to the Serbian SuperLiga in 2019.

In 2021, Silađi joined Gangwon FC.

In 2022, Silađi joined Hanoi FC.

Honours
TSC Bačka Topola
 Serbian First League: 2018–19
Hà Nội
V.League 1: 2022

Individual
 Serbian SuperLiga Top Scorer: 2019–20 (16 goals, shared with Nenad Lukić and Nikola Petković)

References

External links
 
 
 

1993 births
Footballers from Novi Sad
Serbian people of Hungarian descent
Living people
Serbian footballers
Association football forwards
FK Vojvodina players
FK Proleter Novi Sad players
FK Sloga Temerin players
FK Timok players
FK ČSK Čelarevo players
FK TSC Bačka Topola players
Gangwon FC players
Serbian First League players
Serbian SuperLiga players
K League 1 players
Serbian expatriate footballers
Expatriate footballers in South Korea
Serbian expatriate sportspeople in South Korea